Richard Biddle (March 25, 1796 in Philadelphia, Pennsylvania – July 6, 1847 in Pittsburgh, Pennsylvania) was an American author and politician.

Richard Biddle received a classical education, graduated from the University of Pennsylvania in 1811, and was admitted to the bar, practicing law in Pittsburgh. He went to England in 1827, and remained three years, publishing while there a critical Review of Captain Basil Hall's Travels in North America. He also published A Memoir of Sebastian Cabot, with a Review of the History of Maritime Discovery (London, 1831).

Biddle was twice elected to Congress, as an Anti-Mason, serving from March 4, 1837, until his resignation on July 21, 1840.

Richard Biddle was the brother of American financier Nicholas Biddle, nephew of Congressman Edward Biddle and uncle of Congressman Charles John Biddle.

References

Bibliography

External links

The Political Graveyard

1796 births
1847 deaths
Politicians from Philadelphia
Richard
Anti-Masonic Party members of the United States House of Representatives from Pennsylvania
19th-century American politicians
Pennsylvania lawyers
Burials at Allegheny Cemetery
American expatriates in the United Kingdom